Flipping is a term used to describe purchasing a revenue-generating asset and quickly reselling (or "flipping") it for profit.

Within the real estate industry, the term is used by investors to describe the process of buying, rehabbing, and selling properties for profit. In 2017, 207,088 houses or condos were flipped in the US, an 11-year high.

In the United Kingdom, "flipping" is used to describe a technique whereby Members of Parliament were found to be switching their second home between several houses, which had the effect of allowing them to maximize their taxpayer funded allowances.

Types

Wholesaling and assigning a contract
Wholesalers make a profit by signing a contract to purchase a property from a seller and then entering into an agreement with a third party to sell their role of buyer in the contract to an end buyer. All rights to the original purchase contract are assigned to the new buyer and the new buyer pays an "assignment fee" to the wholesaler in order to gain all rights to purchase the property at the original purchase price. The original purchase contract usually has an "inspection period" which allows the original buyer to back out of the contract and not close on it if they do not find a buyer to assign their contract to. Many wholesalers have no intention of actually purchasing the property and simply use wholesaling as a tool to locate properties for other investors.

The general process of wholesaling real estate is as follows:

 Establish a wholesaling business entity. It is possible to be a wholesaler without a legal business entity (i.e. as an individual or working under a DBA). However, the majority of real estate wholesalers form a limited liability corporation (LLC) or C- or S-corporation for tax and liability protection purposes.
 Find undervalued properties to wholesale. This can be done using online advertising, direct mail, personal networking and canvassing neighborhoods. Wholesalers often work together to source properties, as well.
 Sign a purchase and sale agreement with the property owner, often with a wholesaling or assignment clause of some form to allow assignment of the contract to an end buyer. 
 Assign the purchase agreement to a buyer or another wholesaler for a fee. The buyer or new wholesaler pays the original wholesaler a negotiated fee to purchase the right to buy the property from the seller at or above the stated price in the purchase agreement. This right is transferred to the buyer or new wholesaler via an assignment agreement, which is typically embedded in the purchase agreement.

In many cases, if another buyer is not found before the end of the inspection period, the wholesaler cancels the original purchase contract (through its cancellation clause) and gets back the deposit. Wholesaling requires little or no money to be secured in escrow, and in most cases, the wholesaler never intends to actually purchase the property. The practice of wholesaling is often advertised as "no money down and no risk" by many real estate coaching companies and infomercials since the actual deposit can be as little as $10 and often even the deposit can be returned if the wholesaler cancels the contract before the end of the inspection period.

Some people are of the opinion that wholesaling is fraudulent misrepresentation since the wholesaler does not actually intend to close on the property themselves. However, in the United States wholesaling is perfectly legal and most real estate contracts allow the buyer an inspection period and any amount of deposit that buyer and seller agree to. Wholesaling in property is no different from wholesaling in any other industry.

In a successful transaction the seller is often unaware that original buyer is not purchasing the property. In some cases, wholesalers actually purchase the property for cash and then resell the property to their end buyer in a second closing. This practice is considered more costly since the buyer is paying closing costs to purchase the property and to resell the property. However many people consider double closing to be more ethical. In cases where there are substantial profits from reselling it often makes sense for the wholesaler to pay for two closing costs (double closing) to avoid requesting a large assignment fee from their buyer.

Cash home buyer
A cash home buyer is a person or company who can buy a property without a mortgage or loan. A cash home buyer will pay cash for a house. Cash home buyers are a specific type of real estate investor or real estate entrepreneur (see real estate investing). When they purchase a house money (cash) is transferred directly from them to the seller. This transfer typically goes through a third-party title company. These companies provide protection to both the seller and buyer in the transaction which includes providing title insurance. Cash buyers specialize in buying property fast. Typically they advertise that they will buy the house fast, as-is, and pay all fees and commissions. Cash home buyers can be divided into local cash home buyers, regional, and national companies.

The process of selling one's house for cash typically will follow this order.
 Contact a cash buyer (typically email or phone).
 They will want information regarding the condition of the property to be sold.
 They will run comps to determine comparables.
 The buyer will want to verify the condition of the house with a home inspection.
 Before or after the inspection the buyer will send the seller their cash offer AKA a real estate contract.
 If the terms of the contract are agreeable to both the buyer and seller then title work will be completed.
 The final step is closing (real estate).

To find a legitimate cash home buyer one can use a search engine, using search keywords such as "we buy houses", "sell my house fast", "stop foreclosure" "cash home buyers" or "sell my house for cash". Sellers should complete due diligence before selecting a buyer. 

Cash home buyers are different from real estate agents. However, a cash home buyer may also be a real estate agent. Cash home buyers may also refer to themselves as real estate consultants or real estate developers. Cash home buyers are often called cash house buyers.

Real estate consultant
A cash home buyer will often be referred to as a real estate consultant. Various real estate investors or real estate entrepreneurs may also refer to themselves as real estate consultants.

Real estate wholesaler versus cash home buyer
A real estate wholesaler sells the purchase contract/purchase agreement to a third party. Therefore a wholesaler does not buy the property. This is not to be confused with a cash home buyer despite the process being very similar. A cash home buyer will sign a purchase contract and close on the property. In other words, cash home buyers sign contracts to buy houses and close on them. Wholesalers sign contracts to buy houses, assign the contract to someone else, and therefore do not buy houses.

Wholesaling a property multiple times 
It is not uncommon for a property to be assigned multiple times and for a few wholesalers to make money in a transaction from the seller to the end buyer. The original wholesaler enters into a contract to purchase a property and then assigns or sells their rights to that contract to another investor. That investor then assigns their rights to said contract to a third investor and so forth. In many cases wholesalers work together ensuring that all parties get paid on a transaction. This practice is often frowned upon in the real estate community since it seems unethical or illegal. In practice there is nothing illegal about wholesaling or assigning rights to a purchase contract even if it is multiple times. It is important to understand that the reason there is an opportunity to wholesale is because the original seller is selling the property for substantially less than market value. This usually occurs when either the property or the seller is in distress. Examples of distress could be a property damaged by fire, flood, hurricane or a homeowner that is facing foreclosure and is about to lose their home and is selling it for substantially less than fair market value. The practice of buying real estate at substantially below market value is called Distressed Real Estate Investing or Wholesale Real Estate Investing hence the term "wholesaler".

Real estate flipping
Profits from flipping real estate come from either buying low and selling high (often in a rapidly rising market), or buying a house that needs repair and fixing it up before reselling it for a profit ("fix and flip"). 

Under the "fix and flip" scenario, an investor or flipper will purchase a property at a discount price. The discount may be because of:
 the property's condition (e.g., the house needs major renovation and/or repairs which the owner either does not want, or cannot afford, to do), or
 the owner(s) needing to sell a property quickly (e.g., relocation, divorce, pending foreclosure).

The investor will then perform necessary renovations and repairs, and attempt to make a profit by selling the house quickly at a higher price. The "fix and flip" scenario is profitable to investors because the average homebuyer lacks the time and funds to repairs and renovations, so they look for a property that is ready to move into. Also, most traditional mortgage lenders require the home to be habitable with no significant repairs.

Second home flipping
In the UK, Members of Parliament with constituencies outside of London are given an allowance to maintain an extra home in London allowing them to live closer to the Houses of Parliament during the working week. Certain costs for this second home can be claimed and are thus partly funded by the taxpayer. MPs can nominate any of their other properties as the second home, which has tax advantages for not being their primary residence and can lead to additional allowances.

"Flipping" occurs when the nominated second and primary dwellings are frequently changed, particularly during the parliamentary recess. The dwelling may in fact be rented out for profit but still receive the allowances.

In some circumstances, MPs can simultaneously declare one home to be both their primary residence (for tax purposes) and their second residence (for expenses purposes).

The practice ended on 15 May 2009 following publication of the Disclosure of expenses of Members of the United Kingdom Parliament after a public scandal.

Car flipping
Similar to real estate flipping, car flipping is the process of buying automobiles at a low price and reselling them at a higher price for profit. A car flipper will identify reasonably priced vehicles that can be sold at a higher price after reconditioning and marketing to a larger market.

In the United States, car flipping can be a hobby for car enthusiasts, or a primary business in the form of state licensed car dealers. Flipping cars is legal if the vehicles are titled in the person's name or processed through a state licensed dealership. Many states have laws and regulation limiting the number of vehicles a person can flip within each year unless they are a dealer or associate. This number varies from state to state, from 2 to 10. Car flipping has a larger market and requires less investment than flipping real estate.

Product flipping
Just like real estate flipping and car flipping, all consumer products can be flipped. Product flipping entails buying products at a low price and selling it at a higher price for profit. Products can be new or used items. Many times, product flippers buy products at dollar stores, thrift stores, garage sales and estate auctions and resell them at a higher price on online marketplaces or locally.

Compared to real estate flipping and car flipping, product flipping requires much lower capital to get started and thus sellers take on much less risk. Due to lower profit margins, product flippers often employ various tricks that other kinds of flippers do not have to worry about. These tricks include utilizing coupons and cash back rebates as well as finding creative ways of saving on shipping.

Common products that are flipped for profit are clothes, mobile phone, books, and coins. Other less common products that are flipped are digital in nature such as Bitcoin, websites and gaming accounts.

Effects

Bubbles

A spate of flipping often creates an economic bubble which then bursts, such as during the Florida land boom of the 1920s.

In the 2000s, relaxed federal borrowing standards (including subprime lending that allowed a borrower to purchase a home with little or no money down) may have led directly to a boom in demand for houses. Because it was easy to borrow, many investors bought homes as property speculation with no intent to live in them. Since the demand outstripped the supply, prices rose, giving a short-term profit. This resulted in an inflationary spiral until the bubble burst in 2008 and borrowing standards became stricter, leaving the housing market to bottom out.

Flipping was so popular in the United States that many DIY television programs like A&E Network's Flip This House detailed the process.

Flipping becomes less desirable when interest rates are high and so demand is lower. The resulting lack of sales, and major price cuts, results in a flood of properties on the market at one time, resulting in an excess of supply to demand.

Rejuvenation and gentrification

"Rational" flipping can encourage a rejuvenation and restoration of a previously decrepit neighborhood, a process known as gentrification, which increases property values but can cause a population shift.

Under the broken windows theory, an unkempt house or area attracts a criminal element, which drives out those making a responsible living, which allows for more criminal element, and so on in a spiral. Restoration creates jobs, particularly in construction, and generates more sales (and sales taxes) for local vendors and suppliers. The renovated homes attract new populations and businesses to a region, encouraging more economic development; their higher assessed values brings more property tax revenue to local governments, allowing for more improvements and more policing.

When flipping occurs frequently in a community, the total cost of ownership can rise substantially, eventually forcing current residents to relocate, specifically poorer young and old people. On a small scale, flippers can cause distress and disturbance to their immediate neighbors by performing lengthy renovations. Flippers often have no interest in neighborhood integration, which may cause tension with long-term residents.

During the real estate bubble of the 2000s, flipping and gentrification were both linked to the mass migration of people to California, where high real estate prices and ample jobs attracted wealth seekers. In response, many native Californians were forced to migrate to the less expensive areas of states such as Arizona, Nevada, Texas, Oregon and Washington. This migration of Californians caused further gentrification in the areas that they had moved to in large numbers. Areas such as Phoenix, Arizona, and Las Vegas Valley became much more expensive, although property prices dropped significantly after 2006.

In 2020 the emphasis on house flipping shifted to the Midwest, where Greater Cleveland became one of the most lucrative places in the country to own rentals and flip homes. A typical project in the area, as in other areas in the Great Lakes region, pays back twice the cost of the purchased structure. Investors from California have been steered by advisors from the Sun Belt to northeastern Ohio. In 2019 the median flip home was bought for $60,000 and sold for $124,000. 100% margins were also endemic to Akron, Ohio; Pittsburgh; and South Bend, Indiana.

Property values
After a renovation, the house itself will be in better condition and last longer, and can be sold at a higher price, thus increasing its property tax assessed value, plus increased sales for goods and services related to property improvement and the related increase in sales taxes. Neighbors can also benefit by having more attractive homes in the neighborhood, thereby increasing the value of their own homes.

Regulations

In 2006, the US Department of Housing and Urban Development created regulations regarding predatory flipping within Federal Housing Administration (FHA) single-family mortgage insurance. The time requirement for owning a property was greater than 90 days between purchase and sale dates to qualify for FHA-insured mortgage financing. This requirement was greatly relaxed in January 2010, and the 90-day holding period was all but eliminated.

Illegal activity
Flipping can sometimes also be a criminal scheme. Illegal property flipping is a fraud whereby recently acquired property is resold for a considerable profit with an artificially inflated value, typically in order to defraud a lender into lending more than the true value of the property or defraud a buyer into paying a higher price than should be necessary. The property is quickly resold after making few, or only cosmetic, improvements. Illegal property flipping often involves collusion between a real estate appraiser, a mortgage originator and a closing agent. The cooperation of a real estate appraiser is necessary to get a false, artificially inflated, appraisal report. The buyer may or may not be aware of the situation. This type of fraud is one of the most costly for lenders.

Renovating distressed or abandoned properties was sometimes linked to malicious and unscrupulous acts in the post housing bubble era. As a result, "flipping" was frequently used both as a descriptive term for schemes involving market manipulation or other illegal conduct and as a derogatory term for legal real estate investing strategies that are perceived by some to be unethical or socially destructive. The term has a more positive connotation these days with the popularity of television shows like Flip or Flop and Flip That House.

In the United States, the Uniform Standards of Professional Appraisal Practice (USPAP) governs real estate appraisal and Fannie Mae, oversees the secondary residential mortgage loan market. Both have practices to detect illegal flipping schemes.

The term "flip" is also used in relation to certain types of scams, known as "money flip" or "cash flip". In such a scam, the scammer instructs the intended victim to send a certain amount of money, usually via wire transfer, with the promise they can quickly "flip" the money for a larger amount, typically about ten times as much. After the victim has wired the money, the scammer simply keeps the money, cutting off all further contact.

In television
In July 2012, business network CNBC green-lit several pilots for reality television series focusing on house flipping.

The following is a list of several house-flipping shows:
 Bravo's Interior Therapy with Jeff Lewis
 Bravo's Million Dollar Listing and Million Dollar Listing New York
 Bravo's Flipping Out
 TLC's The Adam Carolla Project
 TLC and Channel 4's Property Ladder
 TLC's Flip That House
 TLC's The Real Estate Pros
 A&E's Flip This House
 A&E's Flipped Off
 A&E's Flipping Vegas, Flipping Boston, Flipping San Diego, and Flipping Miami
 HGTV's Flip or Flop
 HGTV's Flipping 101 With Tarek El Moussa
 Spike's Flip Men
 DIY Network's The Vanilla Ice Project
 BBC One's Homes Under the Hammer
 W's Masters of Flip
 HGTV Canada's Holmes and Holmes

See also
 Creative financing
 IPO pricing – factor potentially relevant in flipping stock shares
 Phillip E. Hill Sr. – ringleader of large mortgage fraud scheme
 Real estate investing
 Speculation
 United States housing bubble

References

Sources

Published articles
 —about real-estate flippers in suburban New York.

Books
 
 
 
 
 
 
 
 

Investment
Real estate terminology
United States housing bubble